Francesca Orsini, FBA is an Italian scholar of South Asian literature. She is currently Professor of Hindi and South Asian Literature at the  School of Oriental and African Studies (SOAS), University of London. She previously lectured at the University of Cambridge, before joining SOAS in 2006. For the 2013/2014 academic year, she was Mary I. Bunting Institute Fellow at the Radcliffe Institute for Advanced Study, Harvard University.

Personal life
In 1998, Orsini married Peter Kornicki, an English Japanologist. Orsini is an Italian citizen, and has not applied for either UK citizenship or permanent residence.

Honours
In July 2017, Orsini was elected a Fellow of the British Academy (FBA), the United Kingdom's national academy for the humanities and social sciences.

Selected works

References

Living people
Italian literary critics
Italian women literary critics
Italian literary historians
20th-century Italian historians
21st-century Italian historians
20th-century Italian women writers
21st-century Italian women writers
Fellows of the British Academy
Academics of the University of Cambridge
Academics of SOAS University of London
Radcliffe fellows
Hindi-language literature
Women literary historians
Year of birth missing (living people)
Italian women historians